The Clarkston explosion was a disaster that occurred on 21 October 1971 in a row of shops on the main street of Clarkston, East Renfrewshire, Scotland. The death toll has been stated as 21 or 22.

The explosion followed a build-up of gas in an underground space beneath the Clarkston Toll shops, caused by a gas main leak later ruled to have been accidental. Customers and shop staff had on 20 October complained of a strong smell of gas in the centre and Scottish Gas Board engineers had attended to investigate, but had identified no source for the smell. The engineers were still in attendance at around 2:50pm on the following day when the gas ignited and exploded, killing 22 people and injuring around 100. The victims included many shop staff and people on shopping trips, and the passengers of a bus that had been passing the scene. The explosion destroyed ten shops and a car park above them.

An inquiry was held, and a jury on 11 February 1972 returned a verdict that no fault for the explosion lay with any organisation or individual. No cause was identified for the ignition of the leaked gas, and the leak itself was deemed the result of an accidental gas main fracture caused by "stress and corrosion". The main had been insufficiently supported to withstand vibrations from traffic, and a large crack was found in it during the investigation.

The victims of the disaster are commemorated in a plaque erected in 2001/2 near the site of the explosion.

There is a further tribute to those who lost their lives situated in the entranceway to the Clarkston Halls.

Scottish Television produced a programme on the Clarkston disaster which aired on 20 November 2017.

References 

Explosions in 1971
Explosions in Scotland
1971 disasters in the United Kingdom
1971 in Scotland
History of East Renfrewshire
Gas explosions
October 1971 events in the United Kingdom
Clarkston, East Renfrewshire